Short Cuts is a 1993 American comedy-drama film, directed by Robert Altman. Filmed from a screenplay by Altman and Frank Barhydt, it is inspired by nine short stories and a poem by Raymond Carver. The film has a Los Angeles setting, which is substituted for the Pacific Northwest backdrop of Carver's stories. Short Cuts traces the actions of 22 principal characters, both in parallel and at occasional loose points of connection. The role of chance and luck is central to the film, and many of the stories concern death and infidelity.

The film features an ensemble cast including Matthew Modine, Julianne Moore, Fred Ward, Anne Archer, Jennifer Jason Leigh, Robert Downey Jr., Madeleine Stowe, Chris Penn, Jack Lemmon, Frances McDormand, Lori Singer, Andie MacDowell, Buck Henry, Lily Tomlin, actress and singer Annie Ross, and musicians Huey Lewis, Lyle Lovett, and Tom Waits.

Plot

A fleet of helicopters sprays for medflies, revealing all the characters along their flight path. Dr. Ralph Wyman and wife, Marian, meet couple, Stuart and Claire Kane–an out-of-work salesman and a party clown respectively–at Zoe Trainer's cello concert and make a spontaneous Sunday dinner date.

Marian's sister, Sherri, is married to philandering cop Gene, who carelessly hides his affair with Betty Weathers. Betty is divorcing one of the helicopter pilots, Stormy. Waitress Doreen Piggot is married to alcoholic limo driver, Earl.

Television commentator Howard Finnigan lives with wife, Anne, and their young son, Casey, next door to Zoe and her mother, cabaret singer Tess. Their pool cleaner is Jerry Kaiser, whose wife, Lois, works from home as a phone sex operator, talking to men while tending their children. Jerry and Lois are friends with Doreen's daughter, Honey, and her husband, Bill, who works as a makeup artist.

The day before Casey's eighth birthday, he runs in front of Doreen's car. Casey is hit but appears fine and refuses Doreen's offer of a ride home. His mother Anne comes home from ordering his birthday cake to find him slumped on the couch. His father Howard convinces her to take Casey to the hospital, where he remains unconscious. The baker, Andy Bitkower, calls the next day to inform Ann that the cake is ready, but Howard wants to keep the line free and abruptly ends the conversation. This angers the baker who immediately calls back. The Finnigans maintain their hospital vigil, and Bitkower continues to call the couple. Howard's estranged father Paul turns up at the hospital and recalls the day that Howard was in a car accident as a boy. When Howard's mother went to her sister's house for solace, she found her undressed in front of Paul, who she was attempting to seduce. That led to the estrangement between father and son.

Stuart and his two friends, Gordon and Vern, harass Doreen at the diner before they head out on their three-day fishing trip. On the first day, they find a young woman's body, submerged near some rocks. After some debate, they decide to tie her to the rocks, continue fishing, and report the body when they are done. When he comes home, Stuart eventually admits to Claire what they had done, and she is disgusted that they could fish for days with the woman's body nearby. The body is identified as a 23-year-old woman who was raped and murdered, and Claire visits the funeral home out of a sense of guilt.

Stormy visits Betty's house while she is away with their son Chad (Jarrett Lennon), ostensibly to pick up his mother's clock, but instead spends the day destroying her belongings. Bill and Honey entertain themselves in the apartment that they are watching while its owners are on vacation by taking some pictures of Honey in which Bill has made her up to look as if she has been brutally beaten. Gene abandons the family dog on a strange street because he cannot endure its barking, but after several days of his distraught children's inquiries, he returns to the neighbourhood and retrieves the dog, who has been picked up by Vern's family. The Wymans get into a massive argument just before their dinner party with the Kanes. Marian admits to an affair. Both couples alleviate their stress by drinking heavily, and the party lasts all night long.

One day, Casey's eyes begin to flutter. Anne's excitement grows, but just as he appears to be waking, he suddenly dies. Seeing that and being overwhelmed, Howard's father and the boy's grandfather, Paul, leaves the hospital while the distraught couple returns home and informs Zoe of Casey's death. The next day, they go to the bakery to shame Bitkower over his abuse of them. When he learns why they never picked up the cake, he asks them to stay and gives them baked goods. Zoe, worn to the breaking point by her mother's alcoholism, the little boy's death and her isolation, commits suicide by starting her car engine inside the garage; she plays the cello as she asphyxiates from carbon monoxide. Later that day, her mother discovers Zoe dead and drinks herself into a stupor.

When Honey picks up the pictures from the fotomat, they are mixed up with Gordon's. He is horrified to see the pictures of Honey, who appears to have been beaten badly, and she is horrified by the pictures Gordon took of the submerged body on his fishing trip. They walk away from each other, memorizing each other's license plates. While at a picnic in the park with their wives and kids, Jerry and Bill meet two young women they encountered earlier, and Bill quickly makes an excuse to divvy up into couples. As he and one of the girls walk away from Jerry and the other girl (Susie Cusack), they hear her scream. They turn around to see Jerry hitting her in the head repeatedly with a rock, killing her, just before a major earthquake strikes. In the aftermath, it appears that Jerry's murder of the girl may be attributed to a rock falling during the earthquake.

Cast

Production
According to associate producer Mike Kaplan, the screenplay was first written in 1989. Filming primarily took place in Los Angeles, California. Principal photography began on July 26, 1992, and ended on October 1, 1992.

Release
The film was distributed by Fine Line Features and released in the United States on October 3, 1993. 
A special DVD edition was released by the Criterion Collection in 2004 and contains two discs, the collection of Carver's short stories, and an essay booklet on the film.

Reception
Short Cuts received positive reviews from critics. On Rotten Tomatoes, the film holds a 95% approval rating, based on 58 reviews, with an average rating of 7.8/10. The site's critical consensus reads, "Robert Altman's ensemble drama deftly integrates its disparate characters and episodes into a funny, poignant, emotionally satisfying whole." On Metacritic, the film holds a score of 79 out of 100, based on 22 critics, indicating "generally favorable reviews."

Roger Ebert gave the film four out of four stars and wrote: "Los Angeles always seems to be waiting for something. Permanence seems out of reach; some great apocalyptic event is on the horizon, and people view the future tentatively. Robert Altman's 'Short Cuts' captures that uneasiness perfectly in its interlocking stories about people who seem trapped in the present, always juggling." Vincent Canby of The New York Times wrote, "The lives are often desperate and the characters inarticulate, but the group portrait is as grandly, sometimes as hilariously, realized as anything the director has ever done." Gene Siskel of the Chicago Tribune gave the film four out of four stars and called it "a brilliant companion piece" to The Player. Kenneth Turan of the Los Angeles Times wrote that the film "is not equally involving all the time. Some performances are stronger than others, some situations more entertaining, and some choices Altman has made, like an overreliance on female nudity that borders on the exploitative, difficult to defend. But whenever interest lags, a look, a moment, a frisson of regret will cross the screen and the emotional connection is restored." Rita Kempley of The Washington Post panned the film as "a cynical, sexist and shallow work" populated with "whiny, inert and mostly unlikable characters."

Accolades
Short Cuts was named one of the best films of 1993 by over 50 film critics. Only The Piano and Schindler's List appeared on more lists.

Altman was nominated for the Academy Award for Best Director (but lost to Steven Spielberg for Schindler's List) and shared a nomination for the Golden Globe Award for Best Screenplay with Barhydt (lost to Steven Zaillian for Schindler's List). The cast won a Special Golden Globe Award for their ensemble acting. The film also won the prestigious Golden Lion and the Volpi Cup for Best Ensemble Cast at the Venice Film Festival.

Year-end lists 
 Top 10 (listed alphabetically, not ranked) – Mike Mayo, The Roanoke Times
 No. 1. Peter Travers, Rolling Stone
 No. 1. Armond White, The City Sun
 No. 2. Gene Siskel, Chicago Tribune

Book
A book was released to accompany the film, which compiled the nine short stories and one poem that inspired it. Altman wrote an introduction to this collection, which featured insights into the making of the film and his own thoughts about Carver's stories.

 "Neighbors"
 "They're Not Your Husband"
 "Vitamins"
 "Will You Please Be Quiet, Please?"
 "So Much Water So Close to Home"
 "A Small, Good Thing"
 "Jerry and Molly and Sam"
 "Collectors"
 "Tell the Women We're Going"
 "Lemonade" (poem)

Documentary
Luck, Trust & Ketchup: Robert Altman in Carver County was a behind-the-scenes documentary, featuring interviews with Altman and the cast.

Unfilmed sequel
Anne Rapp, who wrote Cookie's Fortune and Dr. T & The Women for Altman, was commissioned to adapt more Carver stories into a screenplay which he did not film.

References

External links

 
 
 
 Short Cuts: City Symphony an essay by Michael Wilmington at the Criterion Collection

1993 comedy-drama films
1993 films
American comedy-drama films
Best Foreign Film Guldbagge Award winners
1990s English-language films
Films based on multiple works
Films based on poems
Films based on short fiction
Films directed by Robert Altman
Films scored by Mark Isham
Films set in Los Angeles
Films shot in Los Angeles
Independent Spirit Award for Best Film winners
American independent films
1993 independent films
Adultery in films
Films about couples
Films about death
BDSM in films
Golden Lion winners
Hyperlink films
Spelling Films films
+
1990s American films